Dado is an Uzbekistani pop music duo consisting of brothers Alisher Madumarov and Rustam Madumarov, formed in Tashkent in 1999. The band was created by two former members of the band Anor. The duo became one of the most commercially successful pop acts of the 2000s in Uzbekistan. Being polyglots, they wrote and performed songs in Uzbek, English, Russian, Turkish, German, Tajik, French, Spanish, Italian and other languages.

Dado's debut album Y? was released in 2000. Their second album Leto was released in 2004. Dado achieved fame in Uzbekistan and other CIS countries, producing such hits as Yuragim ("My heart"), Benom ("Nameless"), Лето (Leto, "Summer") and "Chat-Pat" ("Discotheque"). Several of Dado's music videos have been broadcast by MTV Russia.

The duo disbanded in 2008. Despite this, they released the single "Космонавты" ("Kosmonavty") along with remixes of their old songs in 2012. One of the band members, Rustam Madumarov, dated Gulnara Karimova, the elder daughter of late Uzbek President Islam Karimov. In 2014 he was sentenced to 10 years imprisonment by an Uzbek court on charges of tax evasion and stealing assets worth millions of dollars. The Panama Papers revealed that Madumarov owned a large number of companies overseas, which were believed to belong to Karimova.

Discography

Studio albums
 2000 Y?
 2004 Лето (Leto)

Singles
 Лето
 Benom
 Yuragim
 Leyla
 Yuguraman
 Dado Nado
 Я знаю тебя
 Chat pat
 Космонавты

Music videos
 No One
 Не плачь
 Лето
 Benom
 Космонавты

Filmography

References

External links
 Album Y? on YouTube
 Album Leto on Youtube
 Single Kosmonavty on Youtube

Uzbekistani musical groups